The G-Force GF01 is an open-wheel racing car developed and produced by American manufacturer Élan Motorsport Technologies for Panoz, with original work having been performed by G-Force Technologies, prior to its acquisition by Panoz, for use in the Indy Racing League. G-Force was chosen to be one of the new constructors for the first generation of inaugural IRL cars, along with Dallara, and the existing Lola and Reynard chassis' used in the existing Champ Car Series. It was used in active competition between 1997 and 1999, and was succeeded by the GF05 in 2000. It famously won the 1997 Indianapolis 500, in the hands of, and being driven by Arie Luyendyk.

References

External links
Élan Motorsport Technologies official website
Panoz Auto Development official website

Panoz vehicles
IndyCar Series
Open wheel racing cars